The Helpmann Award for Best Direction of an Opera is an award presented by Live Performance Australia (LPA), an employers' organisation which serves as the peak body in the live entertainment and performing arts industries in Australia. The accolade is handed out at the annual Helpmann Awards, which celebrates achievements in musical theatre, contemporary music, comedy, opera, classical music, theatre, dance and physical theatre.

The award is given to the "director who has made a material contribution to the Australian aspect of the production." The nominees are determined by the Opera and Classical Music branch of the Helpmann Awards Nominating Panel; winners are chosen by all branches of the Nominating Panel, and other eligible voters.

Winners and nominees

Source:

Notes

A: The win for Dead Man Walking was for Joe Mantello, credited for "production", and Brad Dalton who oversaw the rehearsal and direction of the opera in Australia.

See also
Helpmann Awards

References

External links
The official Helpmann Awards website

O
Opera-related lists
Awards established in 2001
2001 establishments in Australia